Muskingum Island is a long narrow bar island on the Ohio River in Wood County, West Virginia between the towns of Moore Junction, Ohio and Boaz, West Virginia. The island is mostly covered in forests and contains a number of oil wells.

Since 1995, a site on Muskingum Island has been used as a pulse-point for the native mussel population health in the Ohio River Islands National Wildlife Refuge which the island is a part.

See also 
List of islands of West Virginia

References

River islands of West Virginia
Islands of Wood County, West Virginia
Islands of the Ohio River